The Incheon declaration is a declaration on education adopted at the World Education Forum in Incheon, South Korea on 15 May 2015. It is the logical continuation of the Education For All (EFA) movement and the  Millennium Development Goals on Education, and many of its goals were based on a review of progress made since the 2000 World Education Forum in Dakar.

Declaration Content

Equality and Access 
In keeping with its overall goal of ensuring education for all, the Incheon Declaration emphasizes several different types of equality. It focused on equal opportunity as well as the position that students' views must also be taken into consideration. In addition, emphasis is placed on ensuring that cost and discrimination do not prevent people from pursuing and receiving quality education. Gender equality is specifically mentioned as an important aspect of an educational system while diversity is not considered a problem but a resource.

Improvement of Outcomes 
The signatories of the Incheon Declaration also agreed to make improvements in educational outcomes. For instance, it established its commitment "to ensuring that all youth and adults, especially girls and women, achieve relevant and recognized functional literacy and numeracy proficiency levels." Outcome goals also include having developed countries reaching 0.7% of gross national product (GNP) for official development assistance (ODA) to developing countries.

Funding 
Another key recommendation contained in the Incheon Declaration regards funding for education. The signatories are urged to commit 4-6% of their Gross domestic product or 15-20% of their public expenditures to improving the status of education.

Education 2030: A new vision for education 
The Education 2030 Framework for Action, adopted at Incheon in May 2015, recognises lifelong learning for all as one of the underpinning principles of this new vision, stating that “all age groups, including adults, should have opportunities to learn and continue learning.” The framework, which reaffirmed the commitments outlined in the Education for All initiative, became part of the Sustainable Development Goals as SDG4 and was adopted by the United Nations in September of the same year. Those who signed onto the declaration committed to provide twelve years of primary and secondary education paid for by the public. Further, nine of those years will be compulsory. It also calls on countries to “develop policies and programmes for the provision of quality distance learning in tertiary education, with appropriate financing and use of technology, including the Internet, massive open online courses (MOOCs) and other modalities that meet accepted quality standards to improve access.”

See also 
 Qingdao Declaration

Sources

References

Philosophy of education
UNESCO
History of international development
Primary education